Pece Korunovski (born 5 October 1982) is a Macedonian retired football goalkeeper, who last played for FK Mladost Carev Dvor in Second Macedonian Football League.

References

1982 births
Living people
Sportspeople from Bitola
Association football goalkeepers
Macedonian footballers
FK Belasica players
FK Pelister players
FK Vardar players
FK Napredok players
KF Tirana players
FK 11 Oktomvri players
FK Mladost Carev Dvor players
Macedonian First Football League players
Macedonian Second Football League players
Macedonian expatriate footballers
Expatriate footballers in Albania
Macedonian expatriate sportspeople in Albania